The OCW Women's Championship is a women's professional wrestling championship in Ohio Championship Wrestling (OCW). The first title holder was Lexi Lane, who defeated ODB in a tournament final on March 10, 2007. There have been four reigns, shared between three women. Katie Arquette is the current champion, who is in her first title reign.

Tournament 
In March 2007, Ohio Championship Wrestling announced a one-night only eight-women tournament to determine the first OCW Women's Champion.

Title history

Reigns

Footnotes

References 

Women's professional wrestling championships